Cadea palirostrata, also known as Dickerson's worm lizard or the Cuban sharp-nosed amphisbaena, is a species of amphisbaenian in the family Cadeidae, described by herpetologist Mary Cynthia Dickerson in 1913. This species is endemic to Isla de la Juventud (formerly Isle of Pines), an island of western Cuba.

References

palirostrata
Reptiles of Cuba
Endemic fauna of Cuba
Reptiles described in 1916
Taxa named by Mary Cynthia Dickerson